In 1963, Billboard published the Hot R&B Singles chart ranking the top-performing songs in the United States in rhythm and blues (R&B) and related African American-oriented music genres; the chart has undergone various name changes over the decades to reflect the evolution of such genres and since 2005 has been published as Hot R&B/Hip-Hop Songs.  During 1963, 21 different singles topped the chart through the issue dated November 23, based on playlists submitted by radio stations and surveys of retail sales outlets.  After that issue, Billboard discontinued the chart, which did not return until the issue dated January 30, 1965.  No official explanation has ever been given as to why Billboard ceased producing R&B charts.  Chart historian Joel Whitburn has contended that "there was so much crossover of titles between the R&B and pop singles (Hot 100) charts that Billboard considered the charts to be too similar".

In the issue of Billboard dated January 5, Esther Phillips moved up to number one with her version of "Release Me", displacing the final chart-topper of 1962, "You Are My Sunshine" by Ray Charles, but Charles' version of the country song returned to the top of the chart the following week.  The year's longest-running number one was "Fingertips (Part 2)" by Little Stevie Wonder, which spent six consecutive weeks in the top spot in August and September.  Wonder, who would go on to become one of the biggest stars not only in the R&B field but across all genres, was only 12 years old when the live performance was recorded earlier in the year.

The final number one before Billboard stopped publishing the Hot R&B Singles chart was "Sugar Shack" by Jimmy Gilmer and the Fireballs, which moved into the top spot in the final chart to be published, in the issue dated November 23.  The song had previously spent five weeks at number one on the Hot 100.  Songs by Wonder, Paul & Paula, Ruby & the Romantics, the Chiffons, Little Peggy March, Jimmy Soul, Lesley Gore,and the Essex also topped both charts in 1963.  The majority of the acts who topped the R&B chart in 1963 did so for the first time: Paul & Paula, Ruby & the Romantics, the Chiffons, March, Soul, Gore, Barbara Lewis, the Essex, Wonder, Martha and the Vandellas, Garnet Mimms & the Enchanters, Little Johnny Taylor, the Impressions, and Gilmer and the Fireballs all made their first appearance in the peak position during the year.

Chart history

References

Works cited

1963
1963 record charts
1963 in American music